Jason Teague may refer to:

 Jason Teague (Smallville), a character on the TV series Smallville
 Jason Cranford Teague, author of DHTML and CSS for the World Wide Web